Ferenc Forgách may refer to:

Ferenc Forgách, Archbishop of Esztergom
Ferenc Forgách, Bishop of Várad

Ferenc Forgács may refer to:

Ferenc Forgács, Hungarian-born Slovak track and field athlete